= Trackhouse =

Trackhouse may refer to either of the following:

- Trackhouse, a studio album by American hip-hop artist Pitbull.
- Trackhouse Racing, a NASCAR team
- Trackhouse Racing MotoGP, a Grand Prix motorcycle racing team
